Frank Morse was a New Zealand rugby league footballer who represented New Zealand.

Playing career
Morse played for Auckland. He played for New Zealand when they toured Australia in 1911.

He played for the City Rovers in the 1911 Auckland Rugby League season, and also represented Auckland in the same year after switching from the rugby code where he had played for Ponsonby from 1909 to 1911, moving after playing 1 game for the Ponsonby senior side that year.

References

Living people
New Zealand rugby league players
New Zealand national rugby league team players
Auckland rugby league team players
City Rovers players
Year of birth missing (living people)